Review is an evaluation of a publication, product, service, company, or other object or idea. An article about or a compilation of reviews may itself be called a review.

Review may also refer to:

Evaluation processes
Book review, a description and evaluation of a book
Film review, analysis and evaluation of films
Literature review, academic review of the scholarship within a field
Peer review, the process by which scientists assess the work of their colleagues that has been submitted for publication in the scientific literature
Post implementation review, evaluating an entire project as part of closing, for improving the next one
Software review, a process or meeting during which a software product is examined
Systematic review, a focused literature review that synthesizes high-quality research relevant to a specific topic
Taxonomic review is a novel analysis of the variation patterns in a particular taxon

Military
Fleet review (Commonwealth realms), review of ships in the Royal Navy fleet, also applicable to other Commonwealth countries
Naval Review, review of ships in the US Navy fleet

Arts, entertainment, and media

Music
Review (Glay album), 1997
Review (Mikuni Shimokawa album), 2003

Periodicals
Review (magazine) a magazine covering issues of economic policy and management published by the Federal Reserve Bank of St. Louis
Adventist Review, the official newsmagazine of the Seventh-day Adventist Church
Pittsburgh Tribune-Review

Television
Review with Myles Barlow, an Australian television show
Review (TV series), an American remake of the above

Other uses
Review of a sports officiating call, through instant replay

See also
Reviewed (website), a consumer product review website
Revue, a type of multi-act popular theatrical entertainment that combines music, dance and sketches